Luton Borough Council is the local authority for the unitary authority of Luton in Bedfordshire, England. Until 1 April 1997 it was a non-metropolitan district.

Political control
Since the first election to the council in 1973 political control of the council has been held by the following parties:

Non-metropolitan district

Unitary authority

Leadership
The leaders of the council since 1999 have been:

Council elections

Non-metropolitan district elections
1973 Luton Borough Council election
1976 Luton Borough Council election (New ward boundaries)
1979 Luton Borough Council election
1983 Luton Borough Council election
1987 Luton Borough Council election
1991 Luton Borough Council election (Borough boundary changes took place but the number of seats remained the same)
1995 Luton Borough Council election

Unitary authority elections
1996 Luton Borough Council election
1999 Luton Borough Council election
2003 Luton Borough Council election (New ward boundaries)
2007 Luton Borough Council election
2011 Luton Borough Council election
2015 Luton Borough Council election
2019 Luton Borough Council election

By-election results

Vacancy arose from the death of Roy Davies (Liberal Democrat).

The vacancy was caused by the resignation of Labour Cllr Robin Harris.

See also
Politics in Luton

References

 
Council elections in Bedfordshire
Luton